The 2015 Ribble Valley Borough Council election was held on 7 May 2015 to elect members of Ribble Valley Borough Council in England. This was on the same day as other local elections.

Summary
The 2015 Ribble Valley Borough elections saw the Labour Party gain its first elected Councillor for 12 years. It also saw the Conservative Party make gains on the Council at the expense of the Liberal Democrats who lost two net Councillors. The Borough elections was first time all wards in the Ribble Valley went up for election since 2011.

|- style="text-align:center; background-color:#F2F2F2;"
! style="border: 1px solid #aaa;" colspan=2 rowspan=2 | Political party
! style="border: 1px solid #aaa;"           rowspan=2 | Leader
! style="border: 1px solid #aaa;" colspan=6           | Councillors
! style="border: 1px solid #aaa;" colspan=3           | Votes
|- style="text-align:center; background-color:#F2F2F2;"
! style="border: 1px solid #aaa;"                     | Candidates
! style="border: 1px solid #aaa;"                     | Total
! style="border: 1px solid #aaa;"                     | Gained
! style="border: 1px solid #aaa;"                     | Lost
! style="border: 1px solid #aaa;"                     | Net
! style="border: 1px solid #aaa;"                     | Of total (%)
! style="border: 1px solid #aaa;"                     | Total
! style="border: 1px solid #aaa;"                     | Of total (%)
! style="border: 1px solid #aaa;"                     | Change} (%)
|-
| data-sort-value="Conservative Party (UK)" 
| style="border: 1px solid #aaa; text-align: left;" scope="row" | 
| style="border: 1px solid #aaa; text-align: left;" | David Cameron
| style="border: 1px solid #aaa;" | 37
| style="border: 1px solid #aaa;" | 35
| style="border: 1px solid #aaa;" | 3
| style="border: 1px solid #aaa;" | 1
| style="border: 1px solid #aaa;" | 2
| style="border: 1px solid #aaa;" | 87.5
| style="border: 1px solid #aaa;" | 27,161
| style="border: 1px solid #aaa;" | 64.2
| style="border: 1px solid #aaa;" | 5.2
|-
| style="border: 1px solid #aaa;" data-sort-value="Liberal Democrats" 
| style="border: 1px solid #aaa; text-align: left;" scope="row" | 
| style="border: 1px solid #aaa; text-align: left;" | Nick Clegg
| style="border: 1px solid #aaa;" | 10
| style="border: 1px solid #aaa;" | 4
| style="border: 1px solid #aaa;" | 1
| style="border: 1px solid #aaa;" | 3
| style="border: 1px solid #aaa;" | 2
| style="border: 1px solid #aaa;" | 10.0
| style="border: 1px solid #aaa;" | 4,507
| style="border: 1px solid #aaa;" | 10.6
| style="border: 1px solid #aaa;" | 5.6
|-
| data-sort-value="Labour Party (UK)" 
| style="border: 1px solid #aaa; text-align: left;" scope="row" | 
| style="border: 1px solid #aaa; text-align: left;" | Ed Miliband
| style="border: 1px solid #aaa;" | 31
| style="border: 1px solid #aaa;" | 1
| style="border: 1px solid #aaa;" | 1
| style="border: 1px solid #aaa;" | 0
| style="border: 1px solid #aaa;" | 1
| style="border: 1px solid #aaa;" | 2.5
| style="border: 1px solid #aaa;" | 10,655
| style="border: 1px solid #aaa;" | 25.2
| style="border: 1px solid #aaa;" | 10.9
|}

Ward results

Aighton, Bailey and Chaigley

Alston and Hothershall

Billington and Old Langho

Bowland, Newton and Slaidburn

Chatburn

Chipping

Clayton-Le-Dale with Ramsgreave

Derby and Thornley

Dilworth

Edisford and Low Moor

Gisburn and Rimington

Langho

Littlemoor

Mellor

Primrose

Read and Simonstone

Ribchester

Sabden

Salthilll

St Mary's

Waddington and West Bradford

Whalley

Wilpshire

Wiswell and Pendleton

References

2015 English local elections
May 2015 events in the United Kingdom
2015
2010s in Lancashire